The BRD Timișoara Challenger is a tennis tournament held in Timișoara, Romania since 2004. The event is part of the ATP Challenger Tour and is played on outdoor clay courts. For the last three years the tournament was not held due to financial reasons. In early 2012 it was announced that BRD – Groupe Société Générale will sponsor the tournament and thus will rename it to BRD Timișoara Challenger.

Past finals

Singles

Doubles

References

External links 
Romanian Tennis Federation

 
ATP Challenger Tour
Tennis tournaments in Romania
Clay court tennis tournaments